The Wilfried Martens Centre for European Studies, also known as the Martens Centre and previously as the Centre for European Studies, is a think tank and political foundation of the European People's Party (EPP). As the central link of a large network of political foundations, the centre is a catalyst for centre-right ideas and thinking in Europe and beyond. The president of the Martens Centre is former Slovak prime minister Mikuláš Dzurinda.

The centre seeks to ‘inspire ideas for action and shape responses to European challenges’. It analyses and contributes to the debate on EU policy, sharing its insights with European policymakers and the wider public. It also promotes numerous activities surrounding the discussion on the Future of Europe.

Background 

The Martens Centre was founded by the EPP in 2007 as a result of the revision of the EU Regulation on European political parties, which allowed the creation of European political foundations and think tanks by Europarties. Originally, the EPP established its foundation as the Centre for European Studies (CES). During the EPP Congress in Dublin in March 2014, the think tank was renamed as the "Wilfried Martens Centre for European Studies" or "Martens Centre" for short, to honour its founder, long-standing EPP president and former prime minister of Belgium, Wilfried Martens.

The Martens Centre, with over 50 partners across Europe and the rest of the world, embodies a pan-European mindset, promoting Christian-democratic and liberal-conservative political values. It acts as a platform of cooperation for centre-right partners and experts, offering decision-makers and opinion leaders assistance in formulating new and effective policy options to assist the European Union in a variety of areas: global geopolitics, transatlantic relations, and democracy promotion. The Martens Centre produces publications in various formats. Besides the publications, the centre organises various common projects and in-house events throughout the year, along with other major events such as the European Ideas Forum, Net@Work, and the Transatlantic Think Tank Conference.

Publications 
The Martens Centre monitors, analyses, and contributes to the debate relating to the policies of the EU, both on the expert and more general public level. The centre produces research papers, books, policy briefs, collaborative publications, along with several other formats. A major publication of the centre is the European View policy journal, which covers contemporary themes of European politics, focusing on one specific issue in each edition. It typically involves a blend of academics, experts, politicians, and decision-makers. Presidents and prime ministers are regular visiting authors of the journal.

Additional content from the Centre includes:

	Bridge the Channel: a monthly vlog providing updates about political developments in the UK and discussing the future of the Euro-British relationship in the aftermath of Brexit. The series is a successor to the Brexitometer, which provided monthly updates of the Brexit negotiations process.
	Come Together: a new series launched in May 2021, in cooperation with the European People's Party. 
	Podcast series: Brussels Bytes, Defence Dialogue, Europe Out Loud, and a new series on gender equality called Her and EU.

Events 
The Martens Centre organises the European Ideas Forum (EIF), an annual conference bringing together EU leaders, European Commissioners, MEPs, economic experts, business leaders, and other stakeholders to discuss various issues of European relevance. During the COVID-19 pandemic, EIF 2020 (October 2020) and EIF 2021 (June 2021) took place virtually from Brussels, due to sanitary restrictions. EIF 2019 was held in Cyprus in March 2019 and EIF 2018 took place in Paris in June 2018. In addition, the Martens Centre holds the Annual Transatlantic Think Tank Conference, aimed at holding discussions with policymakers from both sides of the Atlantic and discuss themes relating to transatlantic relations.

Other events include:
	Bled Strategic Forum - A leading international conference which offers a platform to express and contrast opinions on modern society and its future. The Forum brings together leaders from government, the private sector, and civil society to discuss and resolve present and future challenges.
   Ideas Network 2030: Summer University - A conference to engage EU and British participants in a debate about the future of Europe in various dimensions. Speakers with political backgrounds from the EU and its member states, and the United Kingdom discuss a range of topics.

Awards and recognition 
The Martens Centre was awarded the ‘Best Digital Channel’ trophy at the Digital Communication Awards in 2018, in recognition for the centre's ‘Europe Out Loud’ podcast series. In addition, the centre was ranked 11th political think tank worldwide in the 2020 Global Go To Think Tank Index Report, compiled by the University of Pennsylvania's Think Tanks and Civil Societies Program (TTCSP).

Network of Member Foundations and Partners of the Martens Centre 
The Martens Centre functions as a pan-European platform for member foundations, think tanks and experts from across Europe that share the centre's values and those of the centre-right EPP political family.

Member Foundations 
	Academy for the Development of a Democratic Environment (Akkademja ghall-Izvilupp ta' Ambjent Demokratiku), Malta
	Amaro da Costa Institute (Instituto Amaro da Costa), Portugal
	Anton Korošec Institute (Inštitut dr. Antona Korošca), Slovenia 
	Anton Tunega Foundation (Nadácia Anton Tunega), Slovakia
	Association of Citizens for European Development of Bulgaria (Сдружение Граждани за Европейско Развитие на България), Bulgaria
	Barankovics lstvan Foundation (Barankovics István Alapítvány), Hungary
	CDA Research Institute (Wetenschappelijk Instituut voor het CDA), the Netherlands
	CEDER Study Centre of CD&V (CEDER Studiedienst CD&V), Belgium
	Centre for Economic and Social Policy Studies (Centre d’Etudes Politiques Economiques et Sociales), Belgium
	Civic Institute (Instytut Obywatelski), Poland
	Collins Institute, Ireland
	Concord and Freedom Foundation (Fundación Concordia y Libertad), Spain
	Croatian Statehood Foundation (Zaklada Hrvatskog Državnog Zavjeta), Croatia
	De Gasperi Foundation (Fondazione De Gasperi), Italy
	Francisco Sá Carneiro Institute (Instituto Francisco Sá Carneiro), Portugal
	Freedom and Democracy Foundation (Fondacioni për Liri dhe Demokraci), Albania
	Glafkos Clerides Institute (Ινστιτούτο Γλαύκος Κληρίδης), Cyprus
	Hanns Seidel Foundation (Hanns Seidel Stiftung), Germany
	Institute dr. Janez Evangelist Krek (Inštitut dr. Janeza Evangelista Kreka), Slovenia
	Institute for Christian Democratic Politics (Institut pro křesťansko-demokratickou politiku), Czech Republic
	Institute for Popular Studies (Institutul de Studii Populare), Romania
	Jarl Hjalmarson Foundation (Jarl Hjalmarson Stiftelsen), Sweden
	Jože Pucnik Institute (Inštitut dr. Jože Pucnika), Slovenia
	Konrad Adenauer Foundation (Konrad-Adenauer-Stiftung), Germany
	Konstantinos Karamanlis Institute for Democracy (ΙΝΣΤΙΤΟYΤΟ ΔΗΜΟΚΡΑΤIΑΣ ΚΩΝΣΤΑΝΤIΝΟΣ ΚΑΡΑΜΑΝΛHΣ), Greece
	Kós Károly Academy Foundation (Kós Károly Akademia), Romania
	Luigi Sturzo Institute (Istituto Luigi Sturzo), Italy
	Matthias Bel Institute (Inštitút Mateja Bela – Bél Mátyás Intézet), Slovakia
	New Initiatives Centre (Fondacija Centar za nove inicijative), Bosnia and Herzegovina
	Political Academy of the Austrian People's Party (Politische Akademie der ÖVP), Austria
	Pro Patria Institute (Koolituskeskus Pro Patria), Estonia
	Toivo Think Tank (Ajatuspaja Toivo), Finland
	TOPAZ, Czech Republic

Partners 
   Antall József Knowledge Centre of Political and Social Sciences Foundation (Antall József Politika- és Társadalomtudományi Tudásközpont Alapítvány), Hungary
   Belgrade Fund for Political Excellence (Beogradski fond za političku izuzetnost), Serbia
	European Academy for Democracy (Evropská akademie pro demokracii), Czech Republic
	European Values (Evropské hodnoty), Czech Republic
	Foundation for Social Research and Analysis (Fundacion para el Análisis y los Estudios Sociales), Spain
	GLOBSEC, Slovakia
	Ideas Network 2030, United Kingdom
	International Republican Institute, United States of America
	Jean Monnet European Center of Excellence, University of Athens, Greece
	Liberal Society (Societatea Liberala), Romania
	Maison du Futur (معهد الشرق الأوسط للأبحاث والدراسات الاستراتجية), Lebanon
	Middle East Institute for Research and Strategic Studies (معهد الشرق الأوسط للأبحاث والدراسات الاستراتجية), Lebanon
	Platform for Sustainable Growth (Plataforma para o Crescimento Sustentável), Portugal
	Robert Schuman Foundation (Fondation Robert Schuman), France
	Robert Schuman Institute, Hungary
	Sofia Security Forum (Софийски форум за сигурност), Bulgaria
	Kompassi (Ajatushautomo Kompassi ry), Finland
	ThinkYoung, Belgium

References

External links 
 Martens Centre Website, martenscentre.eu

2008 establishments in Belgium
Think tanks established in 2008
Think tanks based in Belgium
European People's Party
Political and economic think tanks based in the European Union
Political and economic research foundations
Political foundations at European level